Hetereleotris is a genus of gobies native to the western Indian Ocean and the western Pacific Ocean.

Species
There are currently 18 recognized species in this genus:
 Hetereleotris apora Hoese & R. Winterbottom, 1979 (Poreless goby)
 Hetereleotris bipunctata Tortonese, 1976
 Hetereleotris caminata J. L. B. Smith, 1958 (Mourner)
 Hetereleotris diademata Rüppell, 1830
 Hetereleotris dorsovittata Kovačić & Bogorodsky, 2014 
 Hetereleotris exilis Shibukawa, 2010
 Hetereleotris georgegilli A. C. Gill, 1998 (Gill's goby)
 Hetereleotris kenyae J. L. B. Smith, 1958
 Hetereleotris margaretae Hoese, 1986 (Smooth-scale goby)
 Hetereleotris nebulofasciata J. L. B. Smith, 1958
 Hetereleotris poecila Fowler, 1946
 Hetereleotris psammophila Kovačić & Bogorodsky, 2014 
 Hetereleotris readerae Hoese & Larson, 2005
 Hetereleotris tentaculata J. L. B. Smith, 1958 (Locusthead)
 Hetereleotris vinsoni Hoese, 1986 (Vinson's goby)
 Hetereleotris vulgaris Klunzinger, 1871
 Hetereleotris zanzibarensis J. L. B. Smith, 1958 (Goggle goby)
 Hetereleotris zonata Fowler, 1934 (Goggles)

References

Gobiidae
Taxa named by Pieter Bleeker
Marine fish genera